The 2010–11 Tercera División season is the fourth-tier football league of Mexico. The tournament began on 20 August 2010 and finished on 28 May 2011.

Competition format 
The Tercera División (Third Division) is divided into 14 groups. For the 2009/2010 season, the format of the tournament has been reorganized to a home and away format, which all teams will play in their respective group. The 14 groups consist of teams who are eligible to play in the liguilla de ascenso for one promotion spot, teams who are affiliated with teams in the Liga MX, Ascenso MX and Liga Premier, which are not eligible for promotion but will play that who the better filial team in an eight team filial playoff tournament for the entire season.

The league format allows participating franchises to rent their place to another team, so some clubs compete with a different name than the one registered with the FMF.

Group 1
Group with 14 teams from Campeche, Chiapas, Quintana Roo, Tabasco and Yucatán.

Teams

League table

Group 2
Group with 14 teams from Oaxaca, Tabasco and Veracruz.

Teams

League table

Group 3
Group with 14 teams from Puebla, Tlaxcala and Veracruz.

Teams

League table

Group 4
Group with 13 teams from Guerrero, Mexico City, Morelos, Oaxaca and Puebla.

Teams

League table

Group 5
Group with 16 teams from Greater Mexico City.

Teams

League table

Group 6
Group with 14 teams from State of Mexico.

Teams

League table

Group 7
Group with 14 teams from Hidalgo, Mexico City and State of Mexico.

Teams

League table

Group 8
Group with 14 teams from Greater Mexico City and Hidalgo.

Teams

League table

Group 9
Group with 15 teams from Guanajuato, Guerrero, Michoacán and Querétaro.

Teams

League table

Group 10
Group with 17 teams from Aguascalientes, Durango, Guanajuato, Jalisco, Michoacán and Zacatecas.

Teams

League table

Group 11
Group with 15 teams from Colima, Jalisco and Michoacán.

Teams

League table

Group 12
Group with 18 teams from Jalisco, Michoacán and Nayarit.

Teams

League table

Group 13
Group with 18 teams from Coahuila, Nuevo León, San Luis Potosí and Tamaulipas.

Teams

League table

Group 14

South 
Group with 6 teams from Sinaloa and Sonora.

Teams

League table

North
Group with 7 teams from Baja California, Baja California Sur and Sonora.

Teams

League table

Group 15
Group with 15 teams from Chihuahua, Coahuila and Durango.

Teams

League table

Promotion play-offs

Round of 64

Round of 32

Final stage

Round of 16

First leg

Second leg

Quarter-finals

First leg

Second leg

Semi-finals

First leg

Second leg

Final

First leg

Second leg

Reserve teams play–offs

See also 
Tercera División de México

References

External links 
 Official website of Liga TDP

Mx
1